The 21 Project is the third studio album by American country music artist Hunter Hayes, released in physical format on November 6, 2015 through Atlantic Nashville. Hayes co-produced the collection with Dann Huff. The album includes five songs from his similarly-titled EP, 21, released earlier that year, as well as two new tracks. Each song is available as a studio recording, an acoustic recording, and a live performance from the Wheels Up Tour.

Background
In May 2015, Hayes released the project's lead single, "21", exclusively to streaming service Spotify (and later to digital music platforms including iTunes) in an effort to inspire country music to adapt to new, digital forms of music distribution. Over the next two months, he released a series of additional one-off singles that were then incorporated into an extended play, also titled 21, that was released on Spotify on August 7, 2015. Hayes told Billboard that "this [current] music wasn't created with an album in mind," but his management team confirmed to the magazine that a conventional physical album was expected to be released in the fall of 2015. Warner Music officially announced said album, The 21 Project, in a press release dated October 12, 2015, and was released on November 6, 2015.

Hayes told country music blog The Boot that due to the way it developed, he's "trying not to call [The 21 Project] a record," but thinks of it more as a box set or an art project. According to him, the goal of the project was to "bring the focus back to the music," and to demonstrate how a song evolves "from its original form into something we play on stage." The songs were all rearranged for the acoustic and live performances.

Track listing

Personnel
 Justin Eason - bouzouki, acoustic guitar, electric guitar, mandolin, background vocals
 Hunter Hayes - bouzouki, drum programming, acoustic guitar, bass guitar, electric guitar, resonator guitar, mandola, mandolin, percussion, synthesizer, lead vocals, background vocals
 Dave Haywood - mandolin and vocals on "Where It All Begins"
 Charles Kelley - vocals on "Where It All Begins"
 Devin Malone - banjo, cello, acoustic guitar, electric guitar, resonator guitar, slide guitar, background vocals
 Luke Moller - violin
 Hillary Scott - vocals on "Where It All Begins"
 Andy Sheridan - accordion, Fender Rhodes, acoustic guitar, Hammond B-3 organ, keyboards, piano, synthesizer, background vocals, Wurlitzer
 Steve Sinatra - drums, percussion, background vocals
 Matt Utterback - bass guitar, upright bass, synthesizer bass
 Nir Z. - drums

Charts
The album debuted at No. 16 on Top Country Albums, and No. 93 on Billboard 200, selling 5,300 copies in its first week. The album has sold 12,400 copies in the United States as of December 2015.

Album

Singles

Other songs
"Where It All Begins" also charted at number 45 on the Billboard Hot Country Songs chart in July 2015.

References

2015 albums
Hunter Hayes albums
Atlantic Records albums
Albums produced by Dann Huff